Claudin-7 is a protein that in humans is encoded by the CLDN7 gene. It belongs to the group of claudins.

Claudins, such as CLDN7, are involved in the formation of tight junctions between epithelial cells. Tight junctions restrict lateral diffusion of lipids and membrane proteins, and thereby physically define the border between the apical and basolateral compartments of epithelial cells (Zheng et al., 2003).[supplied by OMIM]

References

External links

Further reading